Beckton Depot is the primary railway maintenance depot for the Docklands Light Railway (DLR).

History 
Upon the initial opening of the DLR in 1987, Poplar DLR depot was the primary maintenance depot. But the proposed extension to Beckton would require more maintenance facilities, and Beckton provided more space in which to both construct larger facilities and provide easier road access for rolling stock delivery. The depot was built on part of the site of the former Beckton Gas Works, and was opened with the extension to Beckton in March 1994 with capacity for 45 single car trains.

The depot is the primary maintenance depot for the DLR, providing both servicing and stabling facilities. Located between Beckton and Gallions Reach stations, it is actually closer to the latter - with rail access is from spurs from the running lines from the Beckton branch (in both directions). Road access to the site is off Armada Way, south of the Gallions Reach Shopping Park.

Expansion 
In the early 2000s, the DLR network was upgraded and expanded - with extensions to London City Airport and Woolwich, as well as the implementation of 3 car trains across the network. To facilitate this, the depot was extended and upgraded in 2005 and 2006, with additional sidings for 36 new trains and improved signalling.

As of the early 2020s, the depot is planned to be extended further in two phases. The first phase will provide space for additional trains, as well as modify the existing maintenance building to allow for easier servicing of the new rolling stock. The second phase will provide additional train stabling facilities, allowing for the rebuilding of Poplar DLR depot with residential towers above a retained depot.

See also 
 Docklands Light Railway rolling stock

References

External links 
 

Railway depots in London
Docklands Light Railway
Beckton DLR depot
Transport in the London Borough of Newham